José De Jesús Padilla Ángeles (born 16 February 1999) is a Mexican footballer who plays as a midfielder for Mineros de Zacatecas.

References

1999 births
Living people
Association football midfielders
Liga MX players
C.F. Pachuca players
Footballers from Michoacán
Mexican footballers
People from Zamora, Michoacán